This is a list of programs produced by ABC Signature, a subsidiary of Disney Television Studios.

Television series

Television films

See also
 List of 20th Television programs
 20th Television Animation

Notes

References

ABC Signature
Disney-related lists
Television series by Disney